Mind-blindness, mindblindness or  mind blindness is a theory initially developed in 1990 that explains autistic people as having a lack or developmental delay of theory of mind (ToM), meaning they are unable to attribute mental states to others. According to the theory, a lack of ToM is considered equivalent to a lack of both cognitive and affective empathy. Mind-blindness in autistic people, in the theory considered a lack of ToM, implies being unable to predict behavior and attribute mental states including beliefs, desires, emotions or intentions of other people. The mind-blindness theory asserts that children who delay in this development will often develop autism. One of the main proponents of  mind-blindness was Simon Baron-Cohen, who later pioneered empathising–systemising theory.

Since the development of strong evidence to demonstrate the heterogeneity of autism and many failed replications of classic theory of mind studies,  mind-blindness has been generally rejected by the scientific community.

Theory of mind 

Mind-blindness is defined as a state where the ToM has not been developed in an individual. According to the theory, neurotypical people can make automatic interpretations of events taking into consideration the mental states of people, their desires, and beliefs. Individuals lacking ToM would therefore perceive the world in a confusing and frightening manner, leading to a social withdrawal. The theory was based on the assumption that biology is linked to autistic behavior, so it was expected that a delayed development or lack of ToM would lead to additional psychiatric complications. Research into a model with more than two categories was also considered.

Mind-blindness, a lack of ToM, was later theorised to be equivalent to a lack of empathy, although research published a year later suggests there is considerable overlap but not complete equivalence. It was empirically demonstrated that processing of complex cognitive emotions is more difficult than processing simpler emotions. In addition, evidence existed at the time that autism was not correlated with the failure of social bonding and attachment in childhood. This was interpreted to suggest that emotion is a component of social cognition that is separable from mentalizing.

Biological basis 

Since the frontal lobe is associated with executive function, it was predicted that the frontal lobe plays an important role in ToM; that executive function and theory of mind share the same functional regions in the brain. Damage to the frontal lobe is known to affect theory of mind, partially confirming this hypothesis. From a 2000 study, it was found that a neural network that comprised the medial prefrontal cortex, the anterior cingulate cortex, the circumscribed region of the anterior paracingulate cortex and the superior temporal sulcus, is crucial for the normal functioning of ToM and self monitoring. Although there is a possibility that ToM and mind-blindness could explain executive function deficits, it was argued that autism is not identified with the failure of executive function alone. It has also been shown that the right temporo-parietal junction behaves differently in those with autism, and the middle cingulate cortex is less active in autistic people during mentalization.

History and relationship to autism

Mind-blindness in cases of autism 
In an attempt to empirically explain the tendency of autistic people to avoid eye contact, a hypothesis was proposed in 1995 called the "mind-blindness hypothesis", which states "that children with autism fail to understand something crucial about the eyes themselves". This hypothesis was tested with participant performance on false-belief tasks and detecting gaze shifts. In the moral blindness hypothesis study, some evidence existed to support this hypothesis. At the time there was insufficient evidence to support a generalization to explain facial processing difficulties and affective sensitivity, common characteristics of autism, with this hypothesis. In 2001, it was suggested that the mind-blindness hypothesis may explain more severe symptoms of autism, including social withdrawal and social skill deficiencies. With good robustness, it was found that a lower performance on mentalization tasks correlates with autism, suggesting mentalization theory as an effective explanatory model of autism, especially for social skill deficiencies. However, the generally unclear physiological basis of mentalization at the time limited a broader understating of the correlation. The 1996 book Theories of Mind argues in support of the mind-blindness hypothesis in spite of inconclusive evidence for its generalisation. Recognising the hypothesis has lost popularity, he argues this is mainly due to the disregard of its proponents to consider the perspectives of autistic people.

The assumption that autism is a homogenous condition underpinned by a theory of mind deficit, genetics, neurological abnormalities, or a 'failure of understanding' as implied by the mind-blindness hypothesis was questioned shortly after its publication. This contrasts with autism as heterogeneous. There is now a large pool of strong evidence supporting the heterogeneity of autism, and general scientific consensus accepts this as contrary to the original mind-blindness hypothesis, although there has existed some disagreement that heterogeneity is incompatible with alternative mind-blindness definitions.

An author of the original mind-blindness hypothesis, Simon Baron-Cohen, later published foundational research in empathising–systemising theory, which asserts there exists neurological sex differences in autism, and that such differences are not due exclusively to socialization.

Mind-blindness towards those with autism 
The double empathy problem, developed in 2012 is a theory in opposition of the  mind-blindness hypothesis, which proposes that social and communication difficulties present in autistic people are due to a reciprocal lack of understanding and bidirectional differences in communication style between autistic people and neurotypical people, as opposed to an asymmetric theory such as the  mind-blindness hypothesis. There is a growing body of evidence supporting the double empathy problem. A possible explanation supported empirically is that the reciprocal lack of understanding between autistic people and neurotypicals is because "we interpret others’ actions according to models built through experience with our own actions".

See also
 Alexithymia
 Causes of autism

Citations

References
Geoffrey Cowley, "Understanding Autism," Newsweek, July 31, 2000.
Simon Baron-Cohen, "First lessons in mind reading," The Times Higher Education Supplement, July 16, 1995.
Suddendorf, T., & Whiten, A. (2001). "Mental evolution and development: evidence for secondary representation in children, great apes and other animals." Psychological Bulletin, 629–650.
Hyman, S. L. (2013). New DSM-5 includes changes to autism criteria. AAP News, 4, 20130604–1.  
National Autism Center. (2020). Online post. https://www.nationalautismcenter.org/  
Wellman, H. M. (1992). The MIT Press series in learning, development, and conceptual change. The child's Theory of Mind. The MIT Press.

Nonverbal communication
Interpersonal relationships
Special education
Autism